Frank Lelle (born 4 February 1965 in Hermersberg) is a German former football player.

Honours
1. FC Kaiserslautern
 Bundesliga: 1990–91
 DFB-Pokal: 1989–90
 DFL-Supercup: 1991

References

External links
 

1965 births
Living people
German footballers
1. FC Kaiserslautern players
FC 08 Homburg players
Bundesliga players
2. Bundesliga players
Association football midfielders
FK Pirmasens players
West German footballers
People from Südwestpfalz
Footballers from Rhineland-Palatinate